Napaeus is a genus of air-breathing land snails, terrestrial pulmonate gastropod mollusks in the subfamily Eninae of the family Enidae.

Distribution 
Napaeus is endemic to the Macaronesia ecoregion: Azores and Canary Islands.

Species
There are three recognized subgenera, Macaronapaeus Kobelt, 1899, Napaeus Albers, 1850 and Napaeinus Hesse, 1933.

Species within the genus Napaeus include 18 species on the Tenerife, 17 species on the La Gomera and others. Additionally, 11 new species from the Canary Islands were described in 2011.
 
 Napaeus alabastrinus Frias Martins, 1989
 Napaeus alucensis Santana & Yanes, 2011- on La Gomera
 Napaeus anaga (Grasset, 1857)
 Napaeus aringaensis Yanes et al., 2011
 Napaeus atlanticus (L. Pfeiffer, 1853)
 Napaeus avaloensis Groh, 2006
 Napaeus badiosus (Webb & Berthelot, 1833)
 Napaeus baeticatus (Webb & Berthelot, 1833) - type species
 Napaeus barquini Alonso & Ibáñez, 2006
 Napaeus bechi M. R. Alonso & Ibáñez, 1993
 Napaeus beguirae Henríquez, 1995
 Napaeus bertheloti (L. Pfeiffer, 1846)
 Napaeus boucheti M. R. Alonso & Ibáñez, 1993
 Napaeus chrysaloides (Wollaston, 1878)
 Napaeus consecoanus (Mousson, 1872)
 Napaeus delibutus (Morelet & Drouët, 1857)
 Napaeus delicatus Alonso, Yanes & Ibáñez, 2011
 Napaeus doliolum Henríquez, 1993
 Napaeus doloresae Santana, 2013
 Napaeus elegans M. R. Alonso & Ibáñez, 1995
 Napaeus encaustus (Shuttleworth, 1852)
 Napaeus esbeltus Ibáñez & M. R. Alonso, 1995
 Napaeus estherae Artiles, 2013
 Napaeus exilis Henríquez, 1995
 Napaeus gomerensis G. A. Holyoak & D. T. Holyoak, 2011 - on La Gomera
 Napaeus grohi Yanes et al., 2011
 Napaeus gruereanus (Grasset, 1857)
 Napaeus hartungi (Morelet & Drouët, 1857)
 Napaeus helvolus (Webb & Berthelot, 1833)
 Napaeus huttereri Henríquez, 1991
 Napaeus indifferens (Mousson, 1872)
 Napaeus inflatiusculus (Wollaston, 1878)
 Napaeus interpunctatus (Wollaston, 1878)
 Napaeus isletae Groh & Ibanez, 1992
 Napaeus josei Yanes et al., 2011
 Napaeus lajaensis Castillo et al., 2006
 Napaeus lichenicola M. R. Alonso & Ibáñez, 2007
 Napaeus maculatus Goodacre, 2006
 Napaeus maffioteanus (Mousson, 1872)
 Napaeus magnus Yanes, Deniz, M. R. Alonso & Ibáñez, 2013
 Napaeus minimus Holyoak & Holyoak, 2011
 Napaeus moquinianus (Webb & Berthelot, 1833)
 Napaeus moroi Martín, Alonso & Ibáñez, 2011 - La Gomera
 Napaeus myosotis (Webb & Berthelot, 1833)
 Napaeus nanodes Shuttleworth, 1852
 Napaeus obesatus (Webb & Berthelot, 1833)
 Napaeus ocellatus (Mousson, 1872)
 Napaeus orientalis Henríquez, 1995
 Napaeus ornamentatus Moro, 2009
 Napaeus osoriensis (Wollaston, 1878)
 Napaeus palmaensis (Mousson, 1872)
 Napaeus procerus Emerson, 2006
 Napaeus propinquus (Shuttleworth, 1852)
 Napaeus pruninus (A. Gould, 1846)
 Napaeus pygmaeus Ibanez & Alonso, 1993
 Napaeus roccellicola (Webb & Berthelot, 1833)
 Napaeus rufobrunneus (Wollaston, 1878)
 Napaeus rupicola (Mousson, 1872)
 Napaeus savinosus (Wollaston, 1878)
 † Napaeus servus (Mousson, 1872) 
 Napaeus severus (J. Mabille, 1898)
 Napaeus subgracilior (Wollaston, 1878)
 Napaeus subsimplex (Wollaston, 1878)
 Napaeus tabidus (Shuttleworth, 1852)
 Napaeus tafadaensis Yanes, 2009
 Napaeus tagamichensis Henríquez, 1993
 Napaeus taguluchensis Henríquez, 1993
 Napaeus tenoensis Henríquez, 1993
 Napaeus teobaldoi Martín, 2009
 Napaeus texturatus (Mousson, 1872)
 Napaeus torilensis Artiles & Deniz, 2011 - on La Gomera
 Napaeus tremulans (Mousson, 1858)
 Napaeus validoi Yanes et al., 2011
 Napaeus variatus (Webb & Berthelot, 1833)
 Napaeus venegueraensis Yanes et al., 2011
 Napaeus voggenreiteri Hutterer, 2006
 Napaeus vulgaris (Morelet & Drouët, 1857)

Species brought into synonymy
 Napaeus arcuatus (Kuester, 1845): synonym of Pseudonapaeus arcuatus (Kuester, 1845) (unaccepted combination)
 Napaeus candelaris (L. Pfeiffer, 1846): synonym of Pseudonapaeus candelaris (L. Pfeiffer, 1846) (unaccepted combination)
 Napaeus coelebs (L. Pfeiffer, 1846): synonym of Pseudonapaeus coelebs (L. Pfeiffer, 1846) (unaccepted combination)
 Napaeus sindicus (Reeve, 1848): synonym of Pseudonapaeus sindicus (Reeve, 1848) (unaccepted combination)
 Napaeus vincentii (Gredler, 1898): synonym of Serina vincentii (Gredler, 1898)

References

Further reading 
 Alonso M. R., Henríquez F. & Ibáñez M. (1995). "Revision of the species group Napaeus variatus (Gastropoda, Pulmonata, Buliminidae) from the Canary Islands, with description of five new species". Zool Scr 24: 303–320.
 Yanes Y., Martín J., Moro L., Alonso M. R. & Ibáñez M. (2009). "On the relationships of the genus Napaeus (Gastropoda: Pulmonata: Enidae), with the description of four new species from the Canary Islands". Journal of Natural History 43(35): 2179–2207.

External links 

 "Species in genus Napaeus". AnimalBase.

Enidae
Taxonomy articles created by Polbot